Dornod ("East") is the easternmost of the 21 aimags (provinces) of Mongolia. Its capital is Choibalsan.

Population 
Halh are the ethnic majority of the Dornod aimag. The Buryat ethnic group makes up 22.8% of the total population (17,196 in 2000, census) concentrated in the north-eastern sums of Dashbalbar, Tsagaan-Ovoo, Bayan-Uul, Bayandun and aimag capital Choibalsan. There are several small ethnic groups: Barga (populates Gurvanzagal and Hölönbuir sums), Uzemchin (are present in Sergelen, Bayantümen, Bulgan, Chuluunhoroot sums and Choibalsan city), Hamnigan ethnic group (Bayan-Uul and  Tsagaan-Ovoo sums).

History 
The aimag was created during the administrative reorganisation of 1941 with the name of Choibalsan, after the communist leader Khorloogiin Choibalsan. The capital, which previously had been called Bayan Tümen, also received the name Choibalsan. In 1963, the aimag was given the current name Dornod.

Transportation 
The Choibalsan International Airport (COQ/ZMCD) has one paved runway, and is served by regular flights to Ulaanbaatar and Hailar, China.

Administrative subdivisions 

 - Sum center is aimag capital Choibalsan

Notable residents
 Chimediin Saikhanbileg, prime minister of Mongolia

References 

 
Provinces of Mongolia
States and territories established in 1941
1941 establishments in Asia